Tabl (also Romanized as Ţabl; also known as Taul, Ţol, and Ţūl) is a village in Salakh Rural District, Shahab District, Qeshm County, Hormozgan Province, Iran. At the 2006 census, its population was 3,082, in 630 families.

References 

Populated places in Qeshm County